

Resident councillors of Singapore (1826-1867)
The resident councillor of Singapore was a high ranking government civil position in colonial Singapore during the Straits Settlements era. It was second only to the governor of the Straits Settlements in the colonial government.

Colonial secretaries of the Straits Settlements (1867–1942)

Colonial Secretaries of Singapore (1946-1955)

Chief Secretaries of Singapore (1955-1959)

References

External links
WorldStatesmen - Singapore
Historical Dictionary of Singapore (Justin Corfield) 
Past and present leaders of Singapore

 
Singapore
British rule in Singapore
Lists of political office-holders in Singapore

Political office-holders in Singapore